The 2017 Bulgarian Cup Final was the 77th final of the Bulgarian Cup. The final took place on 24 May 2017 at Vasil Levski National Stadium in Sofia. It was refereed by Nikola Popov, from Sofia. 

The clubs contesting the final were Ludogorets Razgrad and Botev Plovdiv. This was the second time the final was contested between these two teams. The first one being in 2014 won by Ludogorets 1-0. Botev won the match 2–1, claiming their third Bulgarian Cup and first since 1981.

Route to the Final

Match

Details

References

Bulgarian Cup finals
Cup Final
Botev Plovdiv matches
PFC Ludogorets Razgrad matches